Adventure Florida is a children's BBC television programme and is broadcast on the CBBC channel in which four British children, chosen from 16,000 applicants, join four American children for the ultimate Florida adventure and four US children take part in a summer camp in Florida at which they learn about environmental issues and saving the world's wildlife from extinction. They also learn about how animals live and the difficulties they face in life. The 8 children and the adults stayed together at Mzinga Lodge.

The necklace 
Each day there is a different topic like reptiles and a different word for the day such as confidence or teamwork. Whoever the team leaders think has achieved the word for the day gets to wear the necklace and enjoy a special experience (linked with the topic of the day) with someone of their choice. These are experience are incredibly unique and are often once in a lifetime experience. If two people win the necklace then they both have the special experience.

Participants

Kids from the United States

Kids from the United Kingdom

Team Leaders 
Kelly Deidring and Bill Street (both from Tampa).  Kelly was previously on the Animal Planet show King of the Jungle, where she won this competition.  Bill is the Director of Education at Busch Gardens.

Episodes

External links
 

2000s British children's television series
2008 British television series debuts
2008 British television series endings
BBC children's television shows
English-language television shows
Television series about children